Richard Cousins (born 13 July 1962) is a former Australian rules footballer who played with Footscray in the Victorian/Australian Football League (VFL/AFL).

Cousins started his career at Central District and won their best and fairest award in 1986. At the end of the year, in the 1986 National Draft, Cousins was selected at pick six by VFL club Footscray and made the move to Victoria. He made 20 appearances in 1987, his first season, mostly as a centre half-forward. In 1988, with Andrew Purser no longer at the club having returned to Western Australia, Cousins was Footscray's first ruckman and he had the best season of his career, with eight Brownlow Medal votes. He took 109 marks that year, second only at Footscray to Peter Foster. In 1989 he played another 17 games, then didn't feature at all in the 1990 season, which was followed by a three games season in 1991.

References

1962 births
Australian rules footballers from South Australia
Western Bulldogs players
Central District Football Club players
Living people